American R&B singer Maxwell has released five studio albums, one extended play and twenty five singles.

Albums

Studio albums

Extended plays

Singles

Album appearances

Soundtrack appearances
 1997: Love Jones ("Sumthin' Sumthin': Mellosmoothe (Cut)")
 1999: Life ("Fortunate")
 1999: The Best Man ("Let's Not Play the Game", "As My Girl")
 2000: Love & Basketball ("This Woman's Work")
 2006: Little Man ("Purple Haze")
 2007: Stomp the Yard ("This Woman's Work")

Other works
 1996: Red Hot + Rio ("Seguranca")
 2004: Cottonbelly NYC Sessions ("Luxury")

Notes

References

Discographies of American artists
Rhythm and blues discographies
Soul music discographies